The Constitution of 1923 was a constitution of Egypt from 1923–1952. It was replaced by the Constitution of 1930 for a 5-year period from October 1930 before being restored in December 1935. It adopted the parliamentary representative system based on separation of and cooperation among authorities. The Parliament of Egypt was a bicameral system made up of the Senate and the Chamber of Deputies.

History
After the end of World War I, the Egyptian Revolution broke out in 1919 calling for liberty, independence and democracy. This revolution resulted in the 28 February 1922 declaration which recognized Egypt as an independent state (with some reservations) and ended Egypt's status as a British protectorate.

Based on its new status, Egypt needed a constitution. The first prime minister of newly independent Egypt, Abdel Khalek Sarwat Pasha formed, on 30 April 1922, a 30-member committee, the Committee on the Constitution, to draft a constitution. Its members were thinkers, men of the law, scientists, religious officials, moderate politicians, landowners, merchants and financiers. The Wafd, the most popular political movement in the country refused to participate in the commission. King Fouad I was not happy with an upcoming constitution that would make the people the source of power. He did not promulgate the draft constitution prepared by the committee and proposed to him by Sarwat. After the resignation of Sarwat on 30 November 1922, it took two cabinets and heavy discussions on the constitution, until the King promulgated it on 19 April 1923.

Characteristics
The parliamentary representative system that was adopted ensured that the relationship between the executive and the legislature was based on the principle of control and balance of powers. It made the Cabinet accountable to the parliament, which had the right to move no confidence vote, while giving the King the right to dissolve parliament. However, it gave the parliament the right to convene in case it was not called to sit according to the scheduled date.

As for the Chamber of Deputies, the constitution stated that all its members were to be elected for a 5-year term. On the other hand, three fifths of the Senate members were elected, and the rest were appointed. The constitution also adopted the principle of equal competences for the two branches, with some exceptions.

The number of members was increased from time to time. The Chamber of Deputies, for example, had 214 members from 1924–1930, then it increased to 235. The number decreased under the 1930 Constitution which continued in effect from 1931–1934 to become 150. It increased once again under the 1923 Constitution to become 232 for the period from 1936–1938. Then the number of members became 264 from 1938- 1949. Then it was increased to 319 in 1950 and continued as such up until the Egyptian Revolution of 1952.

The parliament established by the Constitution of 1923 was an advanced step along the course of democracy and representation in Egypt. However, in practice it was mixed with numerous negative aspects. Political life from 1923–1952 varied between tides of limited popular democracy and ebbs due to intervention by occupation forces and the palace, which led to the dissolution of parliament ten times. Moreover, a new constitution was issued in 1930 which lasted for five years. This was a setback to democratic life until the Constitution of 1923 was restored in 1935.

Thus, constitutional conditions deteriorated due to both internal and external reasons. This deterioration was reflected in a state of political and governmental instability to the extent that Egypt had 40 cabinets in the period 1923–1952.

References/Notes

External links

The Egyptian Parliament

1923
Constitution of 1923
Constitution of 1923
Defunct constitutions
Egyptian Revolution of 1919
1923 documents
Constitution of 1923